was a castle in Ōsaki, Miyagi Prefecture, Japan.
After serving Hideyoshi for a time, Date Masamune was given Iwatesawa castle and the surrounding lands as his home domain. Masamune moved there in 1591, rebuilt the castle, renamed it Iwadeyama, and encouraged the growth of a town at its base. Masamune stayed at Iwadeyama for 13 years and turned the region into a major political and economic center.

After the Meiji revolution, all the remaining structures of the castle were removed or destroyed.

See also
 List of castles in Japan

References

Castles in Miyagi Prefecture
Historic Sites of Japan
Former castles in Japan
Ruined castles in Japan
Date clan
Sengoku period